Sir William Campbell Wylie (14 May 1905 – August 1992) was a New Zealand-born colonial judge who was the last Chief Justice of the Combined Judiciary of Sarawak, North Borneo and Brunei and the first Chief Justice of Borneo.

He was born in Dannevirke, New Zealand and educated at Auckland Grammar School and the Victoria University of Wellington. He graduated in law in 1928 and practised at Kaikohe until the Second World War, when he served in the legal department of the Army in the Pacific and the Middle East.

In 1946 he joined the Colonial Legal Service in British Malaya and in the 1950s was appointed Attorney-General of Barbados (1951–55) and British Guiana, after which he was Justice of Appeal in the West Indies. He was knighted in 1963.

In 1963 he was made the last Chief Justice of the Combined Judiciary of Sarawak, North Borneo and Brunei and in the same year became the first Chief Justice of Borneo (until his retirement in 1965). In retirement he was briefly involved in law reform in Tonga and the Seychelles.

He married Leita Clark in 1933.

References

1905 births
1992 deaths
20th-century New Zealand judges
People educated at Auckland Grammar School
Attorneys-General of the Colony of Barbados
Chief justices of Malaysia
Sarawak, North Borneo and Brunei judges
Knights Bachelor
People from Dannevirke
British Borneo judges
Attorneys-General of British Guiana
Colonial Legal Service officers